Piz Fess is a mountain of the Lepontine Alps, situated between the Val Lumnezia and Safiental in the canton of Graubünden. Piz Fess is the culminating point of the Signina range (Romansh: Cadeina dil Signina).

The mountain has two summits, a gentle summit named the Guter Fess ("Good Fess"; 2,874 m) and a not so gentle one named Böser Fess ("Angry Fess"; 2,880 m). In 1894 the pinnacle was still described as unclimbable, but the next summer Karl Viescher from Basel and the local guides Wieland Wieland and J. Christoffel reached the sharp summit.

References

External links
 Piz Fess on Hikr

Mountains of Switzerland
Mountains of Graubünden
Mountains of the Alps
Lepontine Alps
Two-thousanders of Switzerland
Ilanz/Glion
Safiental